The Santa Barbara County Arts Commission is the official arts council of Santa Barbara County, California, USA.

Formed in 1977, the Santa Barbara County Arts Commission is a 15-member body appointed by the County Board of Supervisors with three members from each of the five supervisorial districts who make recommendations to the Board on cultural arts policy. The Santa Barbara County Arts Commission serves as an umbrella for county arts projects, assists communities in raising funds for art programs and provides technical assistance and coordination to arts organizations, artists and local government.

The Arts Commission has several important functions, including: making recommendations for the Percent for the Arts program, which establishes public art throughout the county; serving on grant panels for the County Arts Enrichment awards; and helping to generate cultural arts policy for county constituents.

The Santa Barbara County Arts Commission is the regional cultural development agency, a State and Local Partner of the California Arts Council and manager of the County Percent for Art Program.

The Santa Barbara County Arts Commission meets monthly on the second Wednesday of each month, at 1:30 p.m., at locations throughout the County. Arts Commission meetings are open to the public and Commissioners welcome members of the public to join meetings and share ideas during the public comment period at the beginning of each meeting.

External links

Arts councils of California
Santa Barbara County, California
Government agencies established in 1977
1977 establishments in California